"Ivory Tower" is a song written by Northern Irish singer-songwriter Van Morrison and included on his 1986 album, No Guru, No Method, No Teacher. The song was also released as a single with the B-side "A New Kind of Man", from his previous album A Sense of Wonder. It charted at No. 21 on the US Mainstream Rock Tracks in 1986.

Clinton Heylin writes this about the song "A chorus about how tough 'It really must be/ To be me, to see like me, to feel like me' threatens the spirituality self-effacing mood he had previously maintained." Biographer John Collis takes the same viewpoint by saying "Ivory Tower, totally breaks the mold – it's an r'n'b shaker just like those produced by the Van Morrison of old, though now he suffers from self pity: "Don't you know the price I have to pay/Just to do everything I have to do..."

Billboard said it is an "upbeat r&b boogie."  Cash Box said it is an "outstanding and blustery return to form for the brilliant and visionary Morrison."

Personnel on original release
Van Morrison – vocal
June Boyce – backing vocals
Richie Buckley – tenor saxophone
Martin Drover – trumpet 
David Hayes – bass
Rosie Hunter – backing vocals
Jeff Labes – piano
Chris Michie – guitar
John Platania – guitar
Bianca Thornton – backing vocals
Jeanie Tracy – backing vocals
Baba Trunde – drums

Notes

References
Heylin, Clinton (2003). Can You Feel the Silence? Van Morrison: A New Biography,  Chicago Review Press 
Collis, John (1996). Inarticulate Speech of the Heart, Little Brown and Company, 

1986 singles
Van Morrison songs
Songs written by Van Morrison
Song recordings produced by Van Morrison
1985 songs
Mercury Records singles